Gliophorus viscaurantius is a species of agaric fungus in the family Hygrophoraceae found in New Zealand.

References

Hygrophoraceae
Fungi of New Zealand
Taxa named by Egon Horak